Chukwuemeka Fred Agbata Jnr. (born 10 July 1979) also known as CFA is a Nigerian journalist, technology entrepreneur, business coach, public speaker and television presenter at Channels TV where he hosts the show Tech Trends. He is also a columnist for The Punch called ICT clinic. He is the co-founder of godo.ng, director of Innovation Support Network Hubs and Director of Founder Institute Lagos, and the founder of CFAtech.ng.

Education
Mr Agbata is a graduate of sociology from the Ekiti State University in Ado Ekiti, Nigeria.

Career
Agbata started his career as a sales specialist at Globacom in Lagos, Nigeria from 2003 to 2007.

In 2015, Channels TV began airing his show Tech Trends which aired on Fridays by 6:30 pm (GMT +1). The show's focus on capturing and sharing the latest technology trends, productivity tools, mobiles & PC apps, as well as timely information that will help the viewers become tech-savvy to be able to use technology more productively.
       
Also in 2015, he started a radio show on Family Love Radio Network called Tech on Wheels with CFA and it aired on Wednesdays by 5.15–5.30 pm on 97.7 Love FM Port Harcourt; 6:30–6:45 pm on 104.5 Love FM Abuja and 7:30–7:45 pm on 103.9 Love FM Umuahia.

In 2018, he co-founded GoDoHub, a start-up center with facilities to help entrepreneurs leverage on technology and innovation to start and run their businesses. GoDoHub was unveiled in Ikeja, the Lagos State capital, on 1 October 2018 by John Obaro of SystemSpecs Nigeria Limited.

In March 2019, CFA became the director of The Founder Institute Lagos, a training school that help startups grow through entrepreneurship training by helping curb the lack of structure, mentorship and network.

In March 2019, 75 hubs across Nigeria came together to form an alliance to boost innovation and entrepreneurship. This network, called the Innovation Support Network (ISN) has CFA as one of its director.

He was a member of the 5th executive board of directors at the Nigeria Internet Registration Association (NiRA), from 2017 to April 2019, and also emerged a board member of the 6th executive board of directors.

He is the convener of the CFA's Startup Hangout, a strategic avenue for SME startups to meet and learn from successful entrepreneurs, through discourses that will assist them to grow their various startups as well as network with one another. This platform hosted entrepreneurs like John Obaro, Ommo Clark, Obi Asika. It is hosted in Lagos, Nigeria.

Recognitions
In June 2019, CFA was invited as an international expert by the Swedish Institute as part of their Innovation Ecosystem Programme to meet founders and entrepreneurs for renowned startups and large companies with a focus on innovation.

In 2018, he was invited by the Consul General of the Federal Republic of Germany, Ingo Herbert to be part of the jury for the first Falling Walls Lab Lagos which is a commemoration of the falling of the Berlin Wall.

Also in 2018, he was a media panelist at the Deutsche Welle Global Media Forum (GMF) in Bonn, (Germany), where he discussed the role of journalistic start-ups in illiberal media systems.

He was also a ppanellistalongside former Nigerian Minister of Information Frank Nweke Jnr, former Aviation Minister Osita Chidoka, at the annual Genesys Ignite Tech Conference organized by Genesys Tech Hub in Enugu, where he moderated the panel session on human capital development and innovation.
Slush Global Impact Accelerator, a program created in collaboration with the Ministry for Foreign Affairs of Finland and other multiple partners around the globe with the purpose of supporting impact startups and showcase the exciting business opportunities in emerging markets, selected CFA as one of the judges in Nigeria for the 2018 challenge.

In 2017, he was a panellist at the annual Genesys Ignite Tech Conference organized by Genesys Tech Hub in Enugu, alongside Ommo Clark of iBez Nigeria as well as Obi Asika, while Sen. Ken Nnamani (former president of the Nigerian Senate) gave the keynote speech.

In 2014, CFA was a panelist at the Nigerian Digital Marketing Summit held in Lagos.

Awards
In 2016, CFA received the NiRA Presidential Award for Youth Development, by the Nigeria Internet Registration Association (NIRA).

He was given the Award of Excellence by the Nigerian Top Executives in the IT & Software Industry in 2015.

Also in 2015, he was listed among Nigeria's 100 most innovative persons in Technology by YNaija.

References

Living people
Ekiti State University alumni
1979 births